El ídolo is a Mexican telenovela produced by Valentín Pimstein for Telesistema Mexicano in 1966.

Cast 
Sonia Furió
Luz María Aguilar
Aurora Molina
Alicia Rodríguez
Aldo Monti
Antonio Medellín
Socorro Avelar
Carlos Ancira
Mario Lara
Magda Haller

References

External links 

Mexican telenovelas
1966 telenovelas
Televisa telenovelas
Spanish-language telenovelas
1966 Mexican television series debuts
1966 Mexican television series endings